
Gmina Drohiczyn is an urban-rural gmina (administrative district) in Siemiatycze County, Podlaskie Voivodeship, in north-eastern Poland.

Villages
Apart from the town of Drohiczyn, Gmina Drohiczyn contains the villages and settlements of Arbasy Duże, Arbasy Małe, Bryki, Bujaki, Bużyski, Chechłowo, Chrołowice, Chutkowice, Klepacze, Kłyzówka, Koczery, Lisowo, Lisowo-Janówek, Łopusze, Milewo, Miłkowice-Janki, Miłkowice-Maćki, Miłkowice-Paszki, Miłkowice-Stawki, Minczewo, Narojki, Obniże, Ostrożany, Przesieka, Putkowice Nagórne, Rotki, Runice, Sady, Siekierki, Sieniewice, Skierwiny, Śledzianów, Smarklice, Smorczewo, Sytki, Tonkiele, Wierzchuca Nadbużna, Wierzchuca Nagórna, Wólka Zamkowa and Zajęczniki.

Neighbouring gminas
Gmina Drohiczyn is bordered by the gminas of Grodzisk, Jabłonna Lacka, Korczew, Perlejewo, Platerów, Repki and Siemiatycze.

References
Polish official population figures 2006

Drohiczyn
Siemiatycze County